D. E. Shaw & Co., L.P. is a multinational investment management firm founded in 1988 by David E. Shaw and based in New York City. The company is known for developing complicated mathematical models and sophisticated computer programs to exploit anomalies in the financial market. , D. E. Shaw manages $55billion in AUM, $35billion of which are alternative investments and the remaining $20billion long-oriented investments. In 2018, Institutional Investor reported that among hedge funds, D. E. Shaw had delivered the fifth-highest returns in the world since its inception.

History

1988–1996: Founding and early years
The company was founded by David E. Shaw, a former Columbia University faculty member with a doctoral degree from Stanford. D. E. Shaw began investing in June 1989, having secured $28 million in capital from Paloma Partners Management Co. and a couple of private investors. The company's first office was small and located above a bookstore near New York University. By 1990, the company had moved to a loft on Park Avenue South, and it relocated again the following year to Tower 45 on West 45th Street.

From the start, the company carefully protected its proprietary trading algorithms. Many of its early employees were scientists, mathematicians, and computer programmers. The focus of recruiting broadened to include liberal arts graduates in early 1992.

David Shaw has also placed heavy emphasis on risk management and the preservation of capital. Portfolio managers were expected to perform risk analysis. Eventually, the company would charge an executive committee and a chief risk officer with using scenario analysis and stress-testing to analyze risk at both the strategy and portfolio levels.

In 1994, the company's net return was 26 percent. It managed several hundred million dollars in "market-neutral strategies, including statistical arbitrage, Japanese warrant arbitrage, convertible-bond arbitrage and fixed-income trading." Its non-hedge fund activities in the mid-90s included setting up a broker-dealer subsidiary, founding the e-mail provider Juno Online Services, launching an online banking and brokerage firm, and opening an office in India focused on developing software and systems to support the company's trading operations and online businesses.

1997: Strategic alliance with Bank of America
In 1997, the firm returned capital to most of its early investors in favor of a structured credit facility of nearly $2 billion from Bank of America, with terms that allowed D. E. Shaw & Co. to keep a higher fraction of profits than hedge fund investors normally allow. In effect, Bank of America provided an infusion of $1.4 billion to D. E. Shaw, hoping to benefit from the latter's investment expertise. One year later, Russia defaulted on its debt, resulting in large losses for D. E. Shaw's fixed-income trading portfolio. As a result, Bank of America lost $570 million due to its investment in D. E. Shaw, and paid out an additional $490 million to settle associated shareholder lawsuits.

Following the collapse of this alliance, D. E. Shaw sold off business and laid off employees, reducing its core workforce from 540 employees in 1999 to 180. The company's capital shrank from $1.7 billion to $460 million.

2002: Management transfer
David E. Shaw directed the company from 1988 to 2001. In 2002, he removed himself from day-to-day involvement in the company and transitioned leadership to a team of six of the firm's senior managing directors. The company's management structure of the same six-member Executive Committee remained intact through 2010. In 2010, the company had more than 1,300 employees.Currently, the Executive Committee, comprises Anne Dinning, Max Stone, Julius Gaudio, Eric Wepsic, Eddie Fishman, and Alexis Halaby. Today, the firm has more than 1,700 people across the globe and an institutional-grade infrastructure.

2007: Financial crisis

Multi-strategy fund
At the beginning of the financial crisis in August 2007, D. E. Shaw's multi-strategy fund had assets of $20 billion. A third of the fund's exposure was to the equity markets and equity-linked quantitative strategies. As a result, the fund lost five percent of its assets and had its worst-performing month to that point in time. By September 2008, the company's capital was leveraged at 4x. In the final months of 2008, subsequent gains on its then $15 billion multi-strategy funds had disappeared.

Credit strategies
Twenty percent of the company's assets under management were in its credit strategies and were the hardest hit during the financial crisis.

Redemptions
To avoid loss of portfolio value and asset fire sales, D. E. Shaw displeased some clients by preventing the withdrawal of funds during the financial crisis. Those gates created time delays when clients requested that funds be returned to them. By 2009, D. E. Shaw had returned about $2 billion at clients' requests. One year later, the Financial Times reported that investors estimated that the company had honored an additional $7 billion in client redemption requests.

Overall impact
D. E. Shaw's total assets under management fell from a high of $34 billion in 2007 to $21 billion in 2010. The company had laid off 10% of its workforce by that time.

2019: Non-compete agreements 
In September 2019, D. E. Shaw required all of its employees to sign non-compete agreements, which was traditional for the finance industry but not previously required at the firm, and received some backlash from those at the company.

Investment strategy
The company manages a variety of investment funds that make extensive use of quantitative methods and proprietary computational technology to support fundamental research in the management of its investments. The company also uses qualitative analysis to make private equity investments in technology, wind power, real estate, financial services firms, and distressed company financing. In addition to its financial businesses, D. E. Shaw & Co. has provided private equity capital to technology-related business ventures. Examples include Juno Online Services, an Internet access provider, and Farsight, an online financial services platform that was acquired by Merrill Lynch.

Assets under management
The company had $40 billion in aggregate capital and $15.6 billion in hedge fund assets under management as of 2011. However as of June 1, 2021, the company had $55 billion in assets under management, $35 billion of which are alternative investments and the remaining $20 billion long-oriented investments. It was ranked as the 21st-largest hedge fund by Institutional Investor. While in 2020, D. E. Shaw & Co. was ranked as the 10th largest Hedge Fund globally as measured by discretionary assets under management.

Private equity

U.S. based
In 2004, a subsidiary of one of the company's funds acquired the toy store FAO Schwarz out of bankruptcy. FAO Schwarz reopened for business in New York and Las Vegas in the fall of 2004. In the same year, D. E. Shaw affiliate Laminar Portfolios acquired the online assets of KB Toys, which continued operating as eToys.com. 

In 2006, the Financial Times reported the firm's involvement as potential financing and investment partners for Penn National Gaming (the casino and racetrack company) as an example of the breadth of Wall Street firms' involvement in the "private equity boom," describing D. E. Shaw as "a hedge fund group." The financing was required as Penn National Gaming had a market value of $3.3 billion (2006) and $1.4 billion in annual revenues and wanted to acquire Harrah's Entertainment, a company with a market value of $14.7 billion (2006) and at that time the largest US casino operator.

In late 2009, the Financial Times reported that D. E. Shaw & Co. had set up a portfolio acquisitions unit, the aim of which was to acquire illiquid assets from rival hedge funds, during the financial crisis.

India based
D. E. Shaw entered the Indian market in 2006, with Anil Chawla, then the CEO of GE-Commercial finance, India & South East Asia, as the Country Manager. The India operations were initially headquartered in Hyderabad, Telangana. D. E. Shaw entered into several large private equity deals in the country. This included a joint-venture with India's largest private sector company, Reliance Industries, to provide financial services. Other investments included real estate company DLF Assets Limited and publishing group Amar Ujala Publications, which were subject to Indian regulatory scrutiny and legal disputes. Chawla left his position with D. E. Shaw in 2012. D. E. Shaw scaled down its private equity activities in India after 2013.

Corporate structure

Ownership

Lehman Brothers
In 2007, David E. Shaw sold a 20 percent stake to Lehman Brothers as part of a broader strategy to diversify his personal holdings. D. E. Shaw had $30 billion of assets under management in 2007. At the time of its bankruptcy in September 2008, Lehman Brothers' holdings in D. E. Shaw & Co. remained intact.
In 2015, Hillspire, the family office of Google chairman Eric Schmidt, acquired the 20 percent passive ownership stake in D. E. Shaw & Co. from the bankruptcy estate of Lehman Brothers Holdings Inc.

Flotation candidate
In 2007, the Financial Times reported that D. E. Shaw was commonly mentioned as a flotation candidate among hedge funds.

Corporate affairs

Corporate responsibility
D. E. Shaw supports educational programs such as the American Regions Mathematics League, Worldwide Online Olympiad Training (WOOT), United States of America Mathematics Olympiad and the International Mathematics Olympiad, Mathematical Olympiad Program, the MIT 6.370 Battlecode Competition, and The Center for Excellence in Education.

Prominent former employees
Jeff Bezos, American businessman and founder of Amazon
MacKenzie Scott, American novelist and philanthropist.
Cathy O'Neil, mathematician
David Siegel, computer scientist and co-founder of Two Sigma
John Overdeck, statistician and co-founder of Two Sigma
Lawrence Summers was hired in October 2006 as managing director at D. E. Shaw & Co. He left in 2008, receiving $5.2 million in compensation for one year's work.

Office locations
The firm has offices in New York, Boston, Hong Kong, Hyderabad, Shanghai, Singapore, London, Luxembourg, and Bermuda. 
Hong Kong - Opened 2007 to focus on Chinese private equity
India - Hyderabad - largest office outside of the U.S. with 600 employees
USA - New York City - Headquarters
Silicon Valley - Menlo Park
Boston - Wellesley
Kansas City - Overland Park
Princeton
United Kingdom - Baker Street, London
China - Shanghai - 2010
Bermuda
Luxembourg

Rankings
Whilst not ranking in 2015, D. E. Shaw Group's equity & equity linked strategy fund D. E. Shaw Valence ranked 18th on Penta's Top 100 Hedge Funds in 2016. In the same ranking a multi-strategy fund run by the company called D. E. Shaw Composite ranked 66th in 2015 and 32nd in 2016.

See also
 Two Sigma Investments
 Renaissance Technologies
 D. E. Shaw Research

References

External links
D. E. Shaw & Co. official website
D. E. Shaw Research
Alpha Magazine's profile of D.E. Shaw & Co. (March 2009)
New Yorker article about 30th anniversary of D.E. Shaw & Co. (January 2018)

Hedge funds
Investment management companies of the United States
Hedge fund firms in New York City
Privately held companies based in New York City
Financial services companies established in 1988
1988 establishments in New York City